B&W Hallerne (English: The B&W Halls) is a former industrial complex located on the island of Refshaleøen in Copenhagen, Denmark. Built in the early 1960s by Burmeister & Wain, the complex consists of two large halls which were used to build ships until 1996. Currently, the facilities are used for culture and entertainment activities.

On 2 September 2013, Danish public broadcaster DR announced that it had chosen B&W Hallerne as the host venue for the Eurovision Song Contest 2014. The contest was held at the Section Hall 2, which was converted into a music venue with a capacity for 11,000 spectators. The surrounding buildings and areas were transformed into "Eurovision Island" which was used for additional services related to the contest.

References

External links 

Refshaleøen's Official Website

Buildings and structures in Copenhagen
Culture in Copenhagen
Music venues in Copenhagen
Tourist attractions in Copenhagen